Llinás's law, or law of no interchangeability of neurons, is a statement in neuroscience made by Rodolfo Llinás in 1989, during his Luigi Galvani Award Lecture at the Fidia Research Foundation Neuroscience Award Lectures .

A neuron of a given kind (e.g. a thalamic cell) cannot be functionally replaced by one of another type (e.g. an inferior ollivary cell) even if their synaptic connectivity and the type of neurotransmitter outputs are identical. (The difference is that the intrinsic electrophysiological properties of thalamic cells are extraordinarily different from those of inferior olivary neurons).

The statement of this law is a consequence of an article written by Rodolfo Llinas himself in 1988 and published in Science with the title "The Intrinsic Electrophysiological Properties of Mammalian Neurons: Insights into Central Nervous System Function", which is considered a watershed due to its more than 2000 citations in the scientific literature, marking a major shift in viewpoint in neuroscience around the functional aspect. Until then, the prevailing belief in neuroscience was that just the connections and neurotransmitters released by neurons was enough to determine their function. Research by Llinás and colleagues during the 80's with vertebrates revealed this previously held dogma was wrong.

References

Biology laws
Neuroscience
Colombian inventions